Hypermodernism may refer to:
Hypermodernism (chess), a chess strategy which advocates controlling the center of the board with distant pieces rather than pawns
Hypermodernism (art), a cultural, artistic, literary and architectural movement
Hypermodernity, a deepening or intensification of modernity